Doksan Station is a station on Line 1 of the Seoul Subway. It is an above-ground station located in southwestern Seoul, with service between Uijeongbu and Suwon/Cheonan.

It is a relatively new addition to this section of Line 1, having been opened 1998 in response to growing demand from the adjacent Doksan and Gasan neighborhoods, as well as the Ha'an area in the nearby suburban city of Gwangmyeong. The station is also equipped with an elevator.

It is a two-sided, two-way platform with a screen door. In the middle, there is a Gyeongbu 1-line passage line used by general trains and Seoul-Cheonan express trains. There are two exits, and an elevator was established in 2015.

Vicinity

Exit 1: Dusan Elementary School, Gasan Middle School
Exit 2: Geumcheon Bridge

References

Seoul Metropolitan Subway stations
Metro stations in Geumcheon District
Railway stations opened in 1998